Maja Rindshøj (born 9 April 1997) is a Danish female badminton player.

Achievements

BWF International Challenge/Series
Mixed Doubles

 BWF International Challenge tournament
 BWF International Series tournament
 BWF Future Series tournament

References

External links
 

1997 births
Living people
Danish female badminton players
21st-century Danish women